Grand Theft Auto V is an action-adventure video game developed by Rockstar North and published by Rockstar Games. Upon its release for PlayStation 3 and Xbox 360 in 2013, the game generated controversies related to its violence and depiction of women. A mission that requires players to use torture equipment in a hostage interrogation polarised reviewers, who noted its political commentary but felt that the torture sequence was in poor taste; the mission also received criticism from politicians and anti-torture charity groups. The game became subject to widespread online debate over its portrayal of women, particularly in the wake of backlash against GameSpot journalist Carolyn Petit after she claimed the game was misogynistic in her review. After her webpage received over 20,000 largely negative comments, many journalists defended her right to an opinion and lamented the gaming community's hostility towards criticism. Television personality Karen Gravano and actress Lindsay Lohan both filed lawsuits against Rockstar in allegation that characters in the game were based on their likenesses. Target Australia pulled the game from sale after a Change.org petition claimed that the game "encourages players to commit sexual violence and kill women", despite the petition being criticised as misleading and portrayals of sexual violence in games already being illegal in Australia.

Depiction of torture

The mission "By the Book" generated controversy from reviewers and commentators for its depiction of torture. In the mission, protagonist Trevor Philips interrogates Ferdinand "Mr. K" Kerimov to extract information about an Azerbaijani individual believed to have links with terrorists and poses a threat to the FIB (the Federal Investigation Bureau, the game's version of the FBI). Trevor uses torture methods such as electrocution, removing teeth using pliers, hitting Mr. K with a monkey wrench, and waterboarding on the restrained man. Once Mr. K provides the FIB with the information, Trevor is asked to kill him, but instead drives him to the airport, providing him an opportunity to escape. On the drive to the airport, Trevor monologues about the ineffectiveness of torture, pointing out Mr. K's readiness to supply the FIB with the information without being tortured, and expressing that torture is used as a power play "to assert ourselves".

Reviewers echoed that while the mission served as political commentary on the use of torture by the United States government, its use in the game was in poor taste. IGNs Keza MacDonald felt the sequence "pushed the boundaries of taste", and Polygons Chris Plante said, "the script plays it for laughs. I felt nauseated." Carolyn Petit of GameSpot felt that placing the torture scene in context with the monologue created a hypocrisy in the mission's function as a commentary device. In an editorial, Tom Bramwell of Eurogamer discussed whether the political commentary was overshadowed by the violent content, and compared the mission to the controversy surrounding Call of Duty: Modern Warfare 2s "No Russian" mission. He said that the close-up camera and quick time events accentuated the sequence's impact beyond the violence depicted in previous Grand Theft Auto games. Summarising its function as "flawed", he considered the sequence lacking enough context to justify its violence.

Keith Best of Freedom from Torture said that developer Rockstar North "crossed a line" by forcing players into the role of torturer. British Labour Party MP Keith Vaz said he was "astonished" by the mission's violence, and Alison Sherratt of the Association of Teachers and Lecturers said that parents should be aware of children being exposed to the game because of its realistic graphics and violence. Independent journalist Tom Chick defended the torture sequence, and wrote that unlike the "No Russian" mission or the 2012 film Zero Dark Thirty, the underlying political commentary on torture in "By the Book" necessitated the violent content. When asked about performing the torture sequence, Trevor's actor Steven Ogg said he treated it like "just another day at the office", and was focused more on not making mistakes during filming than the scene's ethics. The torture sequence is censored in Japanese versions of the game.

Portrayal of women
Some reviewers claim that the game's portrayal of women is misogynistic. Chris Plante of Polygon felt that the supporting female characters were constructed on stereotypes, and wrote that the game's "treatment of women is a relic from the current generation". Todd Martens of the Los Angeles Times considered the satirical portrayals of women uncreative, and added that violent and sexist themes hurt the game experience. Edge noted that while "every female in the game exists solely to be sneered, leered or laughed at", it treated its all-male lead characters in a similar vein through their stereotyped tendencies towards violence. Dave Cook of VG247 reinforced the sentiment that the female characters were constructed on stereotypes in an editorial: "They're either there to be rescued, shouted at, fucked, to be seen fucking, put up with, killed, heard prattling away like dullards on their mobile phones or shopping".

Rockstar Games co-founder Sam Houser felt that the development team sometimes overlooked their portrayal of women in Grand Theft Auto games, but that the weight towards male characters "fit with the story we wanted to tell". His brother, Dan Houser, Rockstar head writer and vice president for creative, also referred to the criticism in an interview a year earlier: "But is their argument that in a game about gangsters and thugs and street life, there are prostitutes and strippers—that that is inappropriate? I don't think we revel in the mistreatment of women at all. I just think in the world we're representing, in Grand Theft Auto, that it's appropriate."

In her review, Petit of GameSpot felt there were misogynistic aspects to the treatment of women as "strippers, prostitutes, long-suffering wives, humourless girlfriends and goofy, new-age feminists", and disputed its satirical intention that many had accepted. Her review was met with backlash as users responded with 20,000 largely negative comments on the webpage and a Change.org petition for her firing. Petit's comments and the backlash against them prompted a wider discussion about the role of women in Grand Theft Auto V and the gaming community's hostility towards criticism. Helen Lewis of The Guardian noted that Petit's observations were valid, but were stigmatised by gamers who have become "hyper-sensitive to criticism". Tom Hoggins of The Telegraph wrote that the misogynistic backlash against Petit was predicated on an audience that has become accustomed to women being "shallow and sidelined" in the game. Public school teacher and journalist Cassie Rodenberg of The Guardian wrote that having sex with prostitutes, beating them up, and killing them afterwards to take back the money is allowed in the game itself and encouraged within the Grand Theft Auto V community, including chat rooms and YouTube videos.

Rob Fahey of GamesIndustry.biz wrote that debate about video games' thematic concerns would become stigmatised if unpleasant gamers opposed criticism, writing, "This isn't just about women—it's robbing every single one of us of the opportunity to have intelligent, interesting discussions about how our medium deals with [...] complex topics [...] It's frustrating, it's stupid, and it's downright boring—and it risks making our games stupid and boring too". Journalist Tom Bissell noted Petit's "defensible position", and wrote that gamers respond to game criticism more aggressively than fans of other entertainment mediums. Over a year after her review's publication, Petit stated in her personal blog that the "average straight male player" would likely oppose sociopolitical criticism of video games because Grand Theft Auto Vs "so-called satire" would reinforce his own worldview. She stated that the prominence of "straight white men" in online forums marginalises women, different ethnic groups and the LGBT community, and that those who attack the former, along with "social justice warriors" and the notion of similar criticism cannot "put themselves in the shoes of people different from themselves".

In December 2014, Target Australia removed the game from sale after customers complained about "depictions of violence against women" and a Change.org petition amassed over 40,000 signatures. In a public statement, Target corporate affairs manager Jim Cooper said that the decision was reached after "extensive community and customer concern about the game". The same week, Kmart Australia also pulled the game from shelves. Take-Two Interactive CEO Strauss Zelnick publicly expressed the company's disappointment that the game had been pulled from the retailers, and affirmed that he "stand[s] behind our products, the people who create them, and the consumers who play them". IGNs Luke Reilly called the Change.org petition "misinformed", stating that its complaints about incentives for committing sexual violence in the game are untrue. Sexual violence in games is forbidden by the Australian Classification Board, meaning the game would have been refused classification. Kotaku Mark Serrels said that the depiction of women is inherently problematic, and that Target were within their rights to refuse to stock the game and were obligated to respond to the petition's wide support. David Keogh of ABC News's The Drum felt that Rockstar depended on controversy and were "burned by the fire they voluntarily decided to play with" since the gaming industry is no longer on the margins of popular culture.

Legal actions 
In October 2013, rapper Daz Dillinger issued a cease and desist letter to Rockstar Games and Take Two Interactive for allegedly using two of his songs without authorisation. In February 2014, television personality Karen Gravano of the reality television programme Mob Wives filed suit against Rockstar Games in allegation that a character in the game is based on her likeness and story and was depicted without her consent. Rockstar filed to dismiss Gravano's lawsuit in April, and stated that the allegations are foreclosed by the First Amendment. In July, actress Lindsay Lohan also filed a lawsuit, claiming elements in the game, including the Lacey Jonas character, were influenced by her image, voice and clothing line without permission. Rockstar responded in court papers that sought a dismissal of the case, saying that the case was frivolous and filed for publicity purposes. In 2016, both lawsuits were dismissed.

Notes

References

Bibliography
 

Controversies
Grand Theft Auto V
Criticisms of software and websites
Obscenity controversies in video games
Video game controversies